In mathematical analysis, a positively (or positive) invariant set is a set with the following properties:

Let  where  is a real-valued function. The set  is said to be positively invariant if  implies that 

In other words, once a trajectory of the system enters , it will never leave it again.

References

Dr. Francesco Borrelli 
 A. Benzaouia. book of "Saturated Switching Systems". chapter I, Definition I, Springer 2012.  .

Mathematical analysis